The 1836 United States presidential election in New Hampshire took place between November 3 and December 7, 1836, as part of the 1836 United States presidential election. Voters chose seven representatives, or electors to the Electoral College, who voted for President and Vice President.

New Hampshire voted for the Democratic candidate, Martin Van Buren, over Whig candidate William Henry Harrison. Van Buren won New Hampshire by a margin of 50.02%. As of 2020, this remains the strongest ever performance by any presidential candidate in New Hampshire since the creation of the modern Democratic party in 1828.

Results

See also
 United States presidential elections in New Hampshire

References

New Hampshire
1836
1836 New Hampshire elections